The Florence Shahnameh is the oldest surviving manuscript of the Shahnameh by Ferdowsi. It dates from 614 AH (1217 CE, more than 800 years ago), 200 years after the final completion of the epic poem in 1010, and is unillustrated.  It is a very important manuscript, because it contains old forms of many words. It was discovered in 1978 by Angelo Piemontese, the Italian scholar in the National Central Library of Florence. Prior to the discovery of this manuscript, a London manuscript was considered the oldest surviving manuscript (675 AH, 1276–1277 CE). Djalal Khaleghi Motlagh used this manuscript in his edition of Shahnameh. Older editions of the Shahnameh like the Moscow Edition, did not use this manuscript, because it was not discovered yet at that time. This manuscript is incomplete and contains only half of the Shahnameh.

References

External links 
 Read Online

Manuscripts of Shahnameh
Islamic illuminated manuscripts
13th-century manuscripts